The Bajaj Legend was a popular Indian-made motor scooter produced by Bajaj Auto, Ltd.  First produced in 1999.
The Legend was powered by a new "environmentally friendly" designed 145cc four-stroke, single cylinder engine, with 9 bhp @ 6000 rpm and torque of 11.3 Nm @ 4000 rpm. 

This is coupled to a four speed transmission operated through a classic Vespa-style grip gear shifter. 

The front suspension utilizes a "leading link" and the rear suspension utilizes a "coaxial hydraulic dampner"
	
The wheelbase is 1272 mm.

The weight is 110 kg.

The ground clearance is	145 mm.

The petrol tank capacity is 5 liters.

Legend
Indian motor scooters
Motorcycles introduced in 1999